Financial thriller is a subgenre of thriller fiction in which the financial system and economy play a major role.

History

The novel The Financier (1912) by Theodore Dreiser displays elements of a financial thriller and is an early example of the genre.  Paul Erdman helped popularize the modern financial thriller, with The Billion Dollar Sure Thing (1973). The former president of a Swiss bank, he penned the novel while in jail awaiting trial on fraud charges related to speculating in the cocoa market.

Overview

In many cases the protagonist of a financial thriller is a financial professional such as Christian Slater’s character in the 2005 film The Deal, or John Kent in Martin Bodenham's 2011 novel, The Geneva Connection. Often, the plot centers on a financial crime. It may be a crime that merely enriches a small number of individuals as with The Millionaires by Brad Meltzer, or one that threatens the entire financial system, as in Tom Clancy’s Debt of Honor (1994). In "Flash Crash," by Denison Hatch the financial crime involves an algorithmic programmer ("quant") who is blackmailed into writing a program that will crash the international gold markets.
 
Financial thrillers are often used as morality plays to illustrate the evils of greed, as in Black Money (1995), by Michael M. Thomas.

In the wake of the late-2000s financial crisis, some financial thrillers took on educational roles. The 2011 HBO TV-movie Too Big to Fail is, in the words of Jesse Eisinger, "extraordinarily revealing about the financial crisis" but not always in a helpful way. For example, Eisinger says, "The government gave the banks money but didn't get voting rights and didn't prevent the banks from using the money to pay dividends or bonuses. They wrote what was essentially a blank check...It's left to the hapless PR woman...to wonder why, if the government is saving these institutions, it couldn't impose any limits on how the money be used."  Another film in this genre is J. C. Chandor's Academy Award-nominated Margin Call, also from 2011.

The novel The Economics of Ego Surplus: A Novel About the Global Economy (2010) by Paul McDonnold (originally subtitled "A Novel of Economic Terrorism") involves Kyle Linwood, a teacher, graduate student going for his doctorate in economics, and former victim of Libyan terrorist kidnappers, whose knowledge of Africa and economics become important when the U.S. stock market begins crashing due to massive and inexplicable sales. According to the Book Dilettante, "The author explains supply and demand, recession and inflation, the history of economics and Adam Smith, Keynes['] economic theory, the theory of contemporary neoclassical economists, and does so in a way that even high school students would understand[.]"

In the 2010s, The Big Short was adapted from a non-fiction book into a movie, and it is also a prominent financial thriller.

List of financial thrillers
Wall Street (1987)
Rogue Trader (1999)
Money Monster (2016)
Boiler Room (2000)

References

See also
Social thriller
Hyperlink film

Thriller genres
 
2000s in film
2010s in film
1990s in literature
2010s in literature